Following Jesus is the third solo album from Detroit-native gospel singer Vanessa Bell Armstrong. The album won the Soul Train Music Award in 1988 for the Best Solo Gospel Album category.

Track listing
Side A
 Real Soon (3:57)
 I'm Going Through (4:24)
 Following Jesus (3:54)
 He's Real (6:38)

Side B
 Searching (3:32)
 He's My Everything (4:46)
 There's A Brighter Day (3:31)
 God My God (5:57)

External links
 
 Following Jesus at Malaco Records.
 Flashback Friday - Vanessa Bell Armstrong - Chosen

1986 albums
Vanessa Bell Armstrong albums